Vader's Quest  is a four-issue comic book miniseries set in the Star Wars Expanded Universe, written by Darko Macan and drawn by Dave Gibbons and Angus McKie. Published by Dark Horse Comics, the original four issues appeared in February through May 1999; a trade paperback reprinting all four was released in December of that same year.

Together, the four covers of the individual issues form a tetraptych, which is printed in the trade paperback. They focus on, from left to right, Darth Vader, Palpatine, Jal Te Gniev, and Luke Skywalker.

Synopsis
Soon after the events of the original Star Wars film, the Sith Lord Darth Vader has hired bounty hunters to find out who was responsible for the destruction of the Death Star. At the Museum of the Old Republic, a captured and tortured Rebel pilot, who survived the Death Star battle and returned to his homeworld of Centares, betrays the pilot's surname: Skywalker. Vader attempts to kill every bounty hunter who hears this revelation, but one escapes and heads to Coruscant to tell Palpatine the name in exchange for protection from Vader. Rebel pilot Jal Te Gniev, who is envious and resentful of Luke, tells a woman in a cantina that Luke will be on Jazbina; not knowing anything about Luke besides that he is a wanted man, she then sells this information to an Imperial-connected bounty hunter in exchange for forgiving her father's debt. Vader pursues Luke, and comes face to face with him for the first time on Jazbina (where Jal has also journeyed to warn Luke and redeem himself) but the decidedly anti-Imperial locals force him to leave, saving Luke.

Continuity 
Vader previously met Luke face to face in the 1978 novel sequel to the original film, Splinter of the Mind's Eye, though this book became largely non-canonical with the release of a full-fledged sequel in the form of The Empire Strikes Back (1980).

The unnamed Rebel pilot who betrays Skywalker's name was later revealed to be Thurlow Harris from the video game Star Wars: Rebel Assault (1993).

Collections 
Omnibus: Early Victories (2008)
 Marvel Epic Collection: Star Wars – The Rebellion, Vol. 1 (2016)

References

1999 comics debuts
Dark Horse Comics limited series
Comics based on Star Wars
Comics by Dave Gibbons